Sahm may refer to:

Sahm (surname)
 Sahm International, Beer glassware manufacturer.
 Saham (Arabic: صحم), a coastal town in northeastern Oman.
 SAHM ('stay at home mom/mum/mother'), see Homemaker.